Joseph Landon Evins (October 24, 1910 – March 31, 1984) was an American lawyer and politician who served 15 terms as a Democratic U.S. Representative from Tennessee from 1947 to 1977.

Early life
Evins was a native of the Blend Community of DeKalb County, Tennessee, the son of James Edgar Evins and Myrtie Goodson Evins. His father was a Tennessee state senator and a successful local businessman. He was also the namesake of Edgar Evins State Park near Smithville. One of his brother's children ran a local bank. Another nephew, Dan Evins, was the founder of the Cracker Barrel Old Country Store restaurant chain.

Evins graduated from Vanderbilt University in Nashville, Tennessee in 1933 and the Cumberland School of Law in Lebanon, Tennessee in 1934, as well as The George Washington University. He was admitted to the bar in that same year and began practice in Smithville, the county seat of DeKalb County.

Career
In 1935 Evins was named a staff attorney for the Federal Trade Commission, and served in this position until 1938, when he was named the FTC's assistant secretary, a position which he held until 1940.

Shortly after U.S. entry into World War II, he was commissioned in the United States Army Judge Advocate General Corps, serving on active duty until 1946, when he resumed his law practice in Smithville.

Upon his return, he was also elected chairman of the DeKalb County Democratic Party.  Later in that same year, he won the nomination of the Democratic Party for the seat from the 5th District.  He won the election easily in this solidly-Democratic area, and was re-elected to fourteen more terms, generally with little or no opposition. His district was renumbered the 4th after the 1950 Census, when Tennessee lost a congressional district.

Evins was a powerful figure in Congress.  He was chairman of the House Select Committee on Small Business for six years, and for the following Congressional session of the United States House Committee on Small Business, and served on the important House Appropriations Committee.

He used his influence to make sure that his district, a mostly rural area east and south of Nashville, was well taken-care of; Smithville was the smallest city chosen for participation in the Model Cities Program and its major thoroughfare was renamed "Congressional Boulevard".

The Tennessee Technological University Appalachian Center for Craft near Smithville was built with a $5 million federal grant that Evins secured as a member of the Appropriations Committee.

Evins, a conservative Democrat, was slow to accept racial desegregation. Although he was one of three Tennessee Democratic congressmen not to sign the 1956 Southern Manifesto, and voted in favor of the Voting Rights Act of 1965, he voted against the Civil Rights Acts of 1957, 1960, 1964, and 1968, while voting present on the 24th Amendment to the U.S. Constitution.

Evins decided not to stand for re-election in 1976, after serving a total of 15 terms. At the time of his retirement in January 1977, his continuous service in the U.S. House of Representatives was longer than that of any other House member from Tennessee.

In a spirited primary to succeed him, Al Gore won and began his political career.

Personal life and death
His wife, Ann Smartt, with whom he had three daughters, was the daughter of a McMinnville judge.

Evins died in Nashville on March 31, 1984, and is buried in the Smithville Town Cemetery in Smithville.

References

External links 
 
 
 Who was Joe L. Evins?, DeKalb County, Tennessee website

1910 births
1984 deaths
American members of the Churches of Christ
Burials in Tennessee
Vanderbilt University alumni
People from Smithville, Tennessee
Democratic Party members of the United States House of Representatives from Tennessee
20th-century American politicians